EK, East Kilbride (previously East Kilbride Shopping Centre) is located in the town centre of East Kilbride and is Scotland's biggest undercover shopping centre.

Shopping malls

 EK is made up of six different malls and is now marketed under the EK, East Kilbride brand and is formed of the Centre West, Plaza, Princes Square/Princes Mall and the Olympia/Southgate/The Hub developments. These were built at different times, with some being complete builds from scratch and others having been streets which were later roofed.

History

The original part of the town centre development opened in 1959, with Prince's Square following in 1962 and The Plaza starting in 1971. Other areas of the centre include the refurbishment and roofing in of Prince's Mall (1984) and Prince's Square (1997).

In time for Christmas 1989, the fourth phase of the town centre was completed, and was known as the Olympia Centre. It connected to The Plaza, which underwent refurbishment at the same time.

Built in 2003, the "Centre West" section is the only area of the shopping centre to be split into two floors, with Debenhams (the largest store) having an additional upper floor. Centre West stands on the ground of what used to be the HMRC 'Centre 1' building. The Debenhams store was formally closed in 2021 when it remained closed following the closure of all the UK branches.

In 2015, the Olympia Centre underwent partial refurbishment involving closure of the food court and the relocation of a number of stores. The refurbishment works included the addition of a gym and a number of new restaurants. In November 2016, the new leisure development is known as "The Hub, EK" opened. In 2021 the anchor Sainsbury's store closed.

Hotels

The Stuart Hotel was the first town centre hotel and located at the end of Prince's Square. It opened in 1959 by Scottish and Newcastle Brewers, and was demolished in 2013.

The Bruce Hotel was opened in 1969 and was designed in the brutalist architecture style by Walter Underwood & Partners.

The Ramada Hotel was opened in 2019 in the top four floors of the Plaza tower.

See also

List of shopping centres in the United Kingdom

References

External links
'East Kilbride Shopping Centre' official site
 'East Kilbride Shopping Centre' official Mall Map.

Shopping centres in Scotland
Buildings and structures in East Kilbride
Economy of South Lanarkshire
2003 establishments in Scotland
Shopping malls established in 2003